Zapadnyy is a rural locality (a village) in Sudislavskoye Rural Settlement of Sudislavsky District, Kostroma Oblast, Russia. The  population was 519 as of 2014. There are 9 streets.

History 
The village received this name in 1966.

Geography 
Zapadnyy is located 3 km southwest of Sudislavl (the district's administrative centre) by road. Sudislavl is the nearest rural locality.

References

External links 
 Zapadnyy on komandirovka.ru

Rural localities in Kostroma Oblast
Populated places in Sudislavsky District